Brigadier-General John Carnac (1716 – 29 November 1800) was a British officer who served three times as Commander-in-Chief of India. The son of Capt. Peter Carnac (1665–1756), and Andrienne, née Lelonte (d. c.1762), he was baptised in London.

Military career
Educated at Trinity College Dublin, John Carnac voyaged to India as a lieutenant in the 39th Regiment in 1754 and served at Madras as secretary and aide-de-camp to the colonel of the regiment, John Adlercron. He joined the service of the East India Company as Captain in 1758 after transferring from the 39th foot. After his arrival in Bengal he became secretary and aide-de-camp to Robert Clive, governor of Bengal, and joined him in an expedition against the Prince Ali Gauhar, son of the Mughal emperor Alamgir II.

In 1761 he engaged with and defeated Shah Alam II. He became Brigadier-General in 1764 and participated with Clive in the negotiations with Shuja-ud-Daula and the Mughal emperor Shah Alam II in 1765.

In 1767, Carnac resigned from the company's service in January and returned to England. He purchased an estate near Ringwood in Hampshire and also participated in a largely unsuccessful housing development in Southampton. From 1768 to 1773 he served as M.P. for Leominster. In 1772 he was elected a Fellow of the Royal Society.

By 1773 Carnac was short of money and he returned to India as a member of the Council at Bombay. He was dismissed from the East India Company for his involvement in the Convention of Wadgaon in 1779 and died at Mangalore in November 1800.

Family
In 1765 John Carnac married Elizabeth Woollaston. Then in 1769 he married Elizabeth Catherine Rivett (1751–80), daughter of Thomas Rivett (1713-1763), who had been an MP and Mayor of Derby. A 1775-76 portrait of Mrs. Carnac by Sir Joshua Reynolds hangs in the Wallace Collection in London; a 1778 mezzotint engraving by John Raphael Smith after Reynolds' painting is at the Art Museum of Estonia, with a proof impression at the British Museum.

John Carnac's last will and testament made his brother-in-law James Rivett his heir, provided that he assumed the additional name of Carnac, which he did in 1801.

References

External links
James Rivett profile. Retrieved 10 March 2009.
Usher Family in Scotland: John Carnac profile. Retrieved 10 March 2009.
Usher Family in Scotland: Elizabeth Rivett, later Carnac profile. Retrieved 10 March 2009.

Administrators in British India
39th Regiment of Foot officers
British East India Company Army generals
1716 births
1800 deaths
British Commanders-in-Chief of India
Members of the Parliament of Great Britain for English constituencies
Fellows of the Royal Society
British MPs 1768–1774